Patriarch Cyril of Constantinople may refer to:

 Cyril Lucaris (Patriarch Cyril I Lucaris, 1572–1638), patriarch for six terms between 1612 and 1638
 Patriarch Cyril III of Constantinople, patriarch in 1652 and 1654
 Patriarch Cyril V of Constantinople, patriarch in 1748–1757
 Patriarch Cyril VII of Constantinople, patriarch in 1855–1860

See also 
 Patriarch Cyril (disambiguation)